Garrison Point is a promontory and historically significant urban park located near the junction of Georges River and Prospect Creek.

In 1795 Matthew Flinders, George Bass, and the boy servant William Martin, explored the Georges River to land at what is now Garrison Point and discover the what is now part of City of Canterbury-Bankstown.  The area is so named because in Bankstown's early history, a garrison of soldiers was stationed here to ensure the safety of Major George Johnston as he conducted a census in the area.

The park is now the local focus of annual Australia Day celebrations in the Bankstown area.

See also

Parks in Sydney

References

External links
 Sydney's inner west Online

Parks in Sydney
City of Canterbury-Bankstown